The  is a commuter rail line in the Osaka–Kobe–Kyoto metropolitan area, operated by the West Japan Railway Company (JR West). Its official termini are Kizu Station in Kizugawa and Kyōto Station in Kyoto, within Kyoto Prefecture; however, all trains continue past Kizu on the Yamatoji Line (Kansai Main Line) to Nara Station in Nara, Nara Prefecture.

Overview

The Nara Line is a part of the JR West "Urban Network" in the Kyoto-Osaka-Kobe area. Its primary role is that of an intercity-suburban commuter line, ferrying people to and from work and school in Kyoto and Nara; it is also well-used by tourists holding the Japan Rail Pass, as visiting the historical landmarks of Uji and Nara makes an easy day-trip from Kyoto.

As Kintetsu operates a "Nara Line" of its own, the line is often referred to as the "JR Nara Line" ("JNR Nara Line" prior to 1988). Strictly speaking, the Kintetsu Nara Line links Osaka and Nara (a counterpart to the Yamatoji Line), rather than Kyoto and Nara (connected primarily by the Kintetsu Kyoto Line). However, there are many through trains to the Kintetsu Nara Line from Kyōto Station, so "JR" is often appended for clarity. This was aided by the 1988 introduction of the official nicknames "JR Kyoto Line", "JR Kobe Line" (for parts of the Tōkaidō Main Line and San'yō Main Line) and "JR Takarazuka Line" (southern half of the Fukuchiyama Line) within the Urban Network, making the "JR Nara Line" construction a natural parallel, if unofficial, usage.

Since the formation of JR West in 1988, the line has been under the jurisdiction of the Tennoji Railway Operations Office in Osaka, and its trains use the Osaka Branch's rail yards in Nara. On the other hand, the stations themselves (apart from Kizu) are administered by the Kyoto Branch of JR West. The official line color used on JR West route maps and station guides is brown.

The entirety of the line is part of the Greater Osaka Metropolitan Area. As such, all stations are outfitted with card readers for ICOCA and compatible smart fare-cards; however,  –  are unmanned, and have only simplified automatic ticket gates. Apart from a few stations, the J-Through Card (a prepaid, single-charge fare card) can be used in lieu of cash to buy passenger tickets.

Thus, trains bound for Nara are "down" trains, and those bound for Kyoto are "up", according to the direction they travel on the Yamatoji Line between Kizu and Nara. Except where noted, this article adheres to the same convention.

Line name
The Nara Line proper runs from Kyōto Station to Kizu Station, and lies entirely within Kyoto Prefecture; it has no trackage whatsoever in Nara Prefecture. However, the line was originally built by Nara Railway between Kyoto Station and Nara Station; it was only later, after merging with Kansai Railway, that the section between Kizu and Nara became a part of the Osaka –  route and was officially made a separate line.

Nara Line services run between Nara and Kyōto stations, and are treated as such by passenger announcements and route maps. Thus, even while operating on the Kansai Main Line (Yamatoji Line), trains to and from Kyoto are considered as being on the "Nara Line".

Station list
 This chart is arranged in the "down" direction (Kyoto → Nara), according to the direction of the Kansai Main Line.
 The number in parentheses next to a subway station name is the station number.
 ]： a "station within Kyoto" designated for passenger tickets used with limited-express or Shinkansen tickets. A ticketholder whose destination is marked  may continue on to any of these stations for no additional charge.
 Stopping patterns:
 Local trains stop at all stations (not shown on chart)
 Other designations: ● Stop; ｜Pass
 Miyakoji Rapid: ○ Stop only during the New Year holiday (1–4 January)
 Track:
 ∥: Double-track section; ◇: Single-track section; ∨: Double-track section ends; ∧: Double-track section begins（trains can pass each other at all stations in single-track sections）

Uji City is considering the possibility of a new station between Ōbaku and Uji (cf. Mimurodo Station on the Keihan Uji Line.) However, it is not a part of the current track-duplication project.
Of these stations, Kizu, Uji, Rokujizō, and Kyoto are directly operated by JR West; Yamashiro-Taga is unmanned; Kamikoma and Tanakura are staffed part-time; and the remainder are staffed by JR West Transportation Services.

Abandoned sections
Numbers in parentheses are the distance from Kyoto Station. The portion between Kyoto and Fushimi is now part of the Kintetsu Kyoto Line.

Kyoto (0.00 km) – Hachijō Temporary Station (0.80 km) – Tōji Temporary Station (1.13 km) –  (5.31 km) – Momoyama (7.08 km)

Rolling stock

All trains are based at Nara Depot.
 221 series EMU
 Also operated on the Yamatoji Line and Osaka Loop Line, there are 4 and 6-car trainsets. 4 and 6-car trainsets are mainly used for Miyakoji Rapid, Rapid Service, and Regional Rapid services, though on the Nara Line, the majority of trains are formed as 4 car sets.

 205 series EMU

Start of operation from 18 March 2018. Used for Local trains.

 103 series EMU
 4-car 103 series trains are used as local trains on the Nara Line (and the Yamatoji Line). Some of the cars have been replaced by those transferred from the Morinomiya Depot.

Former rolling stock
Railcars that were used for passenger trains are as follows.

Before electrification
 KiHa 55 Series
 KiHa 58 Series
 KiHa 65 Series
 KiHa 45 Series
 KiHa 40 series
 KiHa 35
 KiHa 20 Series
 KiHa 10 Series

After electrification
 105 series
 115 series
 117 series

History

The Nara Line was originally constructed from Kyoto to Nara by Nara Railway, but at the time of its completion, the Kyoto – Momoyama section ran via the route now used by the Kintetsu Kyoto Line. In 1921, on the day that the Tōkaidō Main Line was re-routed from its original path to the new Baba – Kyoto alignment via the Higashiyama Tunnel, the Kyoto – Inari portion of the old route became part of the Nara Line, and new track was laid between Inari and Momoyama. At the same time, the original Kyoto –  alignment was abandoned, and the Fushimi – Momoyama section became freight-only. Later on, the old right-of-way from Kyoto to Fushimi was sold off to the Kintetsu Kyoto Line's predecessor, Nara Electric Railway.

After the Nara Electric Railway line opened in 1928, its frequency of service and drastically reduced transit time took away much of the demand for through-service between the Tokaido Main Line and the Nara Line. In the 1950s, the Nara Line was among the earliest of the JNR lines to be converted from steam locomotives to diesel multiple unit trainsets, and new stations were opened; after that, however, not much capital was spent on the line, and was not until 1984 that it was finally electrified. In short, it was treated entirely as a local line, rather than as an intercity commuter corridor. The turning point for the Nara Line was only after Japanese National Railways was privatized, and it became part of the JR West network. An article in the Asahi Shimbun from 1991, the same year as JR announced it would be pumping capital into the Nara Line, described the perceived cause for this sudden interest as follows: "During [the previous year's] string of visits by the new Emperor and Empress, their Majesties arrived in Kyoto via JR Central's Tōkaidō Shinkansen, then immediately boarded the Kintetsu line for Nara, ignoring the local JR West trains entirely."

Timeline
 18 August 1879: Kyoto – Inari –  opened as part of the Government-Operated Railway (later the Tōkaidō Main Line). Inari Station opens.
 5 September 1895: Nara Railway opens between Kyoto and Fushimi (3 mi. 23 ch. ≒ 5.29 km). Fushimi Station opens. Kyoto Station is operated in conjunction with the Government Railway.
 3 November 1895: Fushimi – Momoyama extension (1 mi. 9 ch. ≒ 2.19 km) opens. Momoyama Station opens.
 25 January 1896: Momoyama – Tamamizu extension (12 mi. 46 ch. ≒ 20.24 km) opens. Kohata, Uji, Shinden, Nagaike, Tamamizu Stations open.
 13 March 1896: Tamamizu – Kizu extension (4 mi. 50 ch. ≒ 7.44 km) opens. Tanakura and Kizu stations open.
 18 April 1896: Kizu – Nara section opens; entire Kyoto – Nara line complete.
 21 April 1896: Tōji Temporary Station opens.
 1 April 1897: Nara Railway Kyoto Station renamed Shichijō Station.
 3 May 1902: Kamikoma Station opens.
 12 November 1902: Operating distance units changed from a combination of miles and chains to miles only (21 mi. 48 ch. → 21.6 mi.).
 7 February 1905: Nara Railway cedes its track to Kansai Railway.
 1 October 1907: Kansai Railway is nationalized in accordance with the Railway Nationalization Act.
 1 August 1908: Shichijō Station merged with Kyoto Station.
 12 October 1909: Kizu – Kyoto officially designated as the "Nara Line".
 19 December 1910: Ujigawa Signal Station installed between Kohata and Uji stations.
 20 June 1913: Hachijō Signal Station is added between Tōji Temporary Station and Kyoto Station.
 5 November 1913: Ujigawa Signal Station is abandoned.
 23 July 1914: Tōji Temporary Station between Fushimi and Kyoto is abandoned.
 15 August 1914: Hachijō Signal Station abandoned.
 20 March 1921: Ujigawa Signal Station is added once more between Kohata and Uji stations.
 1 August 1921: The Nara Line's Kyoto – Fushimi alignment (3.3 mi. ≒ 5.31 km) is abandoned. The remaining Fushimi – Momoyama section (1.1 mi. ≒ 1.77 km) is closed to passenger traffic. The Tōkaidō Main Line's old Kyoto – Inari alignment (1.8 mi. ≒ 2.90 km), made obsolete after the opening of the Higashiyama Tunnel, is appropriated for the Nara Line. New track (2.6 mi. ≒ 4.18 km) is laid between Inari and Momoyama stations.
 1 April 1922:  renamed .
 13 February 1926: Aodani Bairin Temporary Station opens.
 1 April 1926: Ujigawa Signal Box abandoned.
 3 September 1928: Momoyama – Fushimi freight branch closed. Fushimi Station abandoned.
 1 April 1930: Operating distance units changed to the metric system (21.6 mi. → 34.7 km).
 2 December 1933: Aodani Bairin Temporary Station made permanent and renamed Yamashiro-Aodani.
 15 July 1955: Yamashiro-Taga Station opens.
 27 December 1957: Tōfukuji Station opens.
 11 July 1958: Jōyō Station opens.
 21 April 1961: Ōbaku Station opens.
 2 March 1982: Centralized traffic control (CTC) introduced to the line.
 1 October 1984: Electrification of the line (Kyoto – Kizu). Operations switched to 105 series and 113 series trainsets. Kinokawa Express service (Kyoto–) is ended.
 1 April 1987: Japanese National Railways (JNR) is privatized and divided; the Nara Line is dealt to the newly formed West Japan Railway Company (JR West). JR Freight becomes a Category-2 operator.
 16 March 1991: Rapid Service introduced, using 117 series trainsets. The only stop at the time of introduction is Uji, with Inari as a temporary addition during the New Year holiday.
 22 October 1992: Rokujizō Station opens. Jōyō becomes a Rapid-Service stop.
 March 1994: 113-series trainsets retired from the line.
 4 September 1994： 105 series trainsets retired from the line (moved mainly to Sakurai Line and Wakayama Line service).
 8 March 1997: JR Fujinomori Station opens.
 10 May 1999: Rokujizō becomes a Rapid Service stop.
 3 March 2001: Kyoto – JR Fujinomori, Uji – Shinden sections double-tracked. JR Ogura Station opens. Regional Rapid Service begins. Miyakoji Rapid Service introduced, using 221 series trainsets; 117 series trainsets retired from the line.
 1 October 2001: Tōfukuji becomes a Regional Rapid and Rapid-Service stop.
 15 March 2003: Tōfukuji and Tamamizu become Miyakoji Rapid stops; Tamamizu becomes a Rapid-Service stop.
 1 April 2003: JR Freight ceases Category-2 operation on the line.
 2008: ATS-P installed on the line.
 1 June 2008: All limited expresses and liners made non-smoking.
 29 June 2008: Elevated platforms for the Kansai Main Line and Nara Line at Nara Station enter service
 1 July 2009: All stations made non-smoking.
 1 December 2010: Administration of the line is changed from the Osaka and Kyoto branch offices of JR West to the Kinki Unified Operations Headquarters
 14 March 2015: The Nara Line receives the line designation “D” in station announcements and route diagrams as part of a program for the entire JR West Urban Network
 17 March 2018: Stations on the line receive numbering in station announcements and route diagrams, with Kyoto designated as “D01” and Nara as “D21”. Series 205 trainsets begin revenue service on the line.
 14 March 2020: All weekend Miyakoji Rapid Service trains, previously run as 4- and 6-car trainsets, unified at 6-car length.
 6 December 2020: The double-track section between Yamashiro-Taga and Tamamizu enters service.

Future developments

Double-tracking
Report No. 8 from the 2004 Kinki Transportation Commission, included double-tracking on the JR Fujinomori – Uji and Shinden – Kizu sections of the Nara Line.

However, due to the financial constraints of these local governments, as well as JR West's own fiscal condition, it was ultimately announced that the line would only be fully double-tracked as far as Jōyō, with an additional double-track section between Yamashiro-Taga and Tamamizu. Pre-construction work began in 2013, and the overall duplication is expected to last approximately 10 years, with completion in 2022–23. The remaining single-track sections will be between Jōyō and Yamashiro-Taga, and between Tamamizu and Kizu.

References

External links

 
 Tourist information website 

Lines of West Japan Railway Company
Rail transport in Kyoto Prefecture
Railway lines opened in 1879
1067 mm gauge railways in Japan